The 1986 Porsche Tennis Grand Prix was a women's tennis tournament played on indoor hard courts in Filderstadt, West Germany that was part of the 1986 WTA Tour. It was the ninth edition of the tournament and was held from 13 October through 19 October 1986. First-seeded Martina Navratilova won the singles title.

Finals

Singles
 Martina Navratilova defeated  Hana Mandlíková 6–2, 6–3

Doubles
 Martina Navratilova /  Pam Shriver  defeated  Zina Garrison /  Gabriela Sabatini 7–6(7–5), 6–4

References

External links
 
 ITF tournament edition details
 Tournament draws

Porsche Tennis Grand Prix
Porsche Tennis Grand Prix
Porsche Tennis Grand Prix
1980s in Baden-Württemberg
Porsche Tennis Grand Prix
Porsch